Yes, I'm a Witch is a remix album by Yoko Ono released on February 6, 2007 by Apple Records and Astralwerks. Artists invited to contribute were asked to select a song from Ono's back catalogue, and were then presented with all the necessary elements to create a remix/cover of their desire. According to the press release, nearly every artist chose only the vocals, and created entirely new backing tracks to demonstrate the versatility of Ono's compositions.

The song choices span Ono's career from her early experimental work with John Lennon in the late 1960s through to her solo career in the 1970s and 1980s. The album draws its title from a 1974 Ono song featured on her album A Story, a track which is featured on the album in a reworked version by The Brother Brothers.

A follow-up compilation of dance remixes, Open Your Box, was released on April 24.

In July 2015, Pitchfork announced a sequel to Yes, I'm a Witch—titled Yes, I'm a Witch Too—with collaborations and remixes from Miike Snow, Portugal. The Man, Death Cab for Cutie, Penguin Prison, Peter Bjorn and John, Tune-Yards, Moby and others, released on February 19, 2016 on Manimal Vinyl.

Track listing
All songs written by Yoko Ono.
Hank Shocklee – "Witch Shocktronica Intro" (1:47)
Peaches – "Kiss Kiss Kiss" (3:18)
Shitake Monkey – "O'Oh" (3:38)
Blow Up – "Everyman Everywoman" (4:01)
Le Tigre – "Sisters, O Sisters" (2:47)
Porcupine Tree – "Death of Samantha" (4:35)
DJ Spooky – "Rising" (4:13)
The Apples in Stereo – "Nobody Sees Me Like You Do" (3:56)
The Brother Brothers – "Yes, I'm a Witch" (3:48)
Cat Power – "Revelations" (3:52)
The Polyphonic Spree – "You and I" (3:26)
Jason Pierce (from Spiritualized) – "Walking on Thin Ice" (5:07)
Anohni and Hahn Rowe – "Toyboat" (4:24)
The Flaming Lips – "Cambridge 1969/2007" (5:37)
The Sleepy Jackson – "I'm Moving On" (4:55)
Hank Shocklee – "Witch Shocktronica Outro" (0:30)
Craig Armstrong – "Shiranakatta (I Didn't Know)" (3:09)

 Track 4 first released in 2004 as "Everyman Everywoman" (Blow-Up Radio Edit)
 Track 6 first released in 2003 on the "Will I"/"Fly" remix single
 Track 17 first included on the 2004 Benefits Compilation "Genocide in Sudan"
 All other tracks previously unreleased

Charts

References

External links
Shitake Monkey website
Press release on a-i-u.net

Yoko Ono albums
2007 remix albums
Astralwerks remix albums